Kenton may refer to:

Places

Canada
Kenton, Manitoba

South Africa
Kenton-on-Sea

United Kingdom
Kenton, Devon
Kenton, London
Kenton station, Kenton Road, Kenton, London
Kenton, Newcastle upon Tyne, Tyne and Wear
Kenton, Suffolk
Kenton railway station (Suffolk)

United States
Kenton, Delaware
Kenton Hundred
Kenton County, Kentucky
Kenton, Kentucky
Kenton, Michigan
Kenton, Ohio
Kenton, Oklahoma
Kenton, Portland, Oregon
Kenton Hotel
Kenton, Tennessee

People

Kenton Allen (born 1965), British television producer
Kenton Cool (born 1973), English mountaineer
Kenton Couse (1721–1790), English architect
Kenton Duty (born 1995), American actor and singer
Kenton Grua (1950–2002), American river guide
Kenton Keith (born 1980), American football player
Kenton Keith (diplomat) (born 1939), American diplomat
Kenton Onstad (born 1953), American politician
Kenton Richardson (born 1999), English football player
Kenton Smith (born 1979), Canadian ice hockey player

Ships
 , an attack transport of the United States Navy during World War II
 , the name of two ships

Other uses
Kenton (cigarette)
Kenton Archer, a fictional character in The Archers

See also

Kenton High School (disambiguation)
Ken-Ton, the pairing of Kenmore, New York and Tonawanda, New York
Kenton in Hi-Fi, a 1956 album by Stan Kenton